The Newz is the twenty-first studio album by the hard rock band Nazareth, released in March 2008. It is the first album by the band to feature new drummer Lee Agnew, who replaced original drummer Darrell Sweet, who died in 1999.

Track listing 
All songs by Dan McCafferty, Pete Agnew, Jimmy Murrison, and Lee Agnew

"Dying Breed" Includes the hidden track "The Goblin King" featuring Rammstein starting at 9:05; The vinyl edition doesn't contain the hidden track.

Personnel 
Nazareth
 Pete Agnew - bass guitar, backing vocals
 Dan McCafferty - lead vocals
 Jimmy Murrison - guitars
 Lee Agnew - drums

Chart performance

References 

Nazareth (band) albums
2008 albums
Edel Music albums